This article contains a list of fossil-bearing stratigraphic units in the state of Kentucky, U.S.

Sites

See also

 Paleontology in Kentucky

References
 

Kentucky
Paleontology in Kentucky
Stratigraphy of Kentucky
Kentucky geography-related lists
United States geology-related lists